The 1996 Qatar Crown Prince Cup was the second edition of this cup tournament in men's football (soccer). It was played by the top 4 teams of the Q-League.

Al-Rayyan were crowned champions for the second season running and would therefore enter the next edition on the Asian Club Championship, which was previously reserved for the regular season league winners. Al-Wakrah, who lost in the final would enter the next edition of the Gulf Club Championship.

Results

Match details

Final

References

Qatar Crown Prince Cup
1995–96 in Qatari football